National Wildlife Refuge System (NWRS) is a designation for certain protected areas of the United States managed by the United States Fish and Wildlife Service (FWS). The National Wildlife Refuge System is the system of public lands and waters set aside to conserve America's fish, wildlife, and plants. Half of the total area is in Alaska, and one third is in the Pacific Ocean.

Background 
The mission of the refuge system is "To administer a national network of lands and waters for the conservation, management, and where appropriate, restoration of fish, wildlife, and plant resources and their habitats within the United States for the benefit of the present and future generations of Americans" (National Wildlife Refuge System Improvement Act of 1997). The system maintains the biological integrity, diversity, and environmental health of these natural resources and enables for associated public enjoyment of these areas where compatible with conservation efforts.

National Wildlife Refuges manage a full range of habitat types, including wetlands, prairies, coastal and marine areas, and temperate, tundra, and boreal forests. The management of each habitat is a complex process of controlling or eradicating invasive species, using fire in a prescribed manner, assuring adequate water resources, and assessing external threats such as development or contamination.

Hundreds of national refuges are home to some 700 species of birds, 220 species of mammals, 250 reptile and amphibian species, and more than 1000 species of fish. Endangered species are a priority of National Wildlife Refuges, with nearly 60 refuges having the primary purpose of conserving in aggregate 280 threatened or endangered species.

The National Wildlife Refuge System welcomes nearly 50 million visitors each year to participate in outdoor recreational activities. The system manages six wildlife-dependent recreational uses in accordance with the National Wildlife Refuge System Improvement Act of 1997, including hunting, fishing, birding, photography, environmental education, and environmental interpretation. Hunters visit more than 350 hunting programs on refuges and on about 36,000 waterfowl production areas. Opportunities for fresh or saltwater fishing are available at more than 340 refuges. At least one wildlife refuge is in every state.

National Wildlife Refuge System employees are responsible for planning, biological monitoring and habitat conservation, contaminants management, visitor services, outreach and environmental education, heavy equipment operation, law enforcement, and fire management.

The National Wildlife Refuge System deals with urban intrusion/development, habitat fragmentation, degradation of water quantity and quality, climate change, invasive species, increasing demands for recreation, and increasing demands for energy development. The system has provided a habitat for endangered species, migratory birds, plants, and numerous other valuable animals, implemented the NWRS Improvement Act, acquired and protected key critical inholdings, and established leadership in habitat restoration and management.

Under the act, the NWRS has created Comprehensive Conservation Plans (CCPs) for each refuge, developed through consultation with private and public stakeholders. These began a review process by stakeholders beginning in 2013. The CCPs must be consistent with the FWS goals for conservation and wildlife management.

The CCPs outline conservation goals for each refuge for 15 years into the future, with the intent that they will be revised every 15 years thereafter. The comprehensive conservation planning process requires a scoping phase, in which each refuge holds public meetings to identify the public's main concerns; plan formulation, when refuge staff and FWS planners identify the key issues and refuge goals; writing the draft plan, in which wildlife and habitat alternatives are developed, and the plan is submitted for public review; revision of the draft plan, which takes into consideration the public's input; and plan implementation.

Each CCP is required to comply with the National Environmental Policy Act (NEPA) and must consider potential alternatives for habitat and wildlife management on the refuge, and identify their possible effects on the refuge. The NEPA requires FWS planners and refuge staff to engage the public in this planning process to assist them with identifying the most appropriate alternative.

Completed CCPs are available to the public and can be found on the FWS website.

History

Management activities (as of Q3 2015)

Comprehensive wildlife and habitat management demands the integration of scientific information from several disciplines, including understanding ecological processes and monitoring status of fish, wildlife and plants. Equally important is an intimate understanding of the social and economic drivers that impact and are affected by management decisions and can facilitate or impede implementation success. Service strategic habitat conservation planning, design, and delivery efforts are affected by the demographic, societal, and cultural changes of population growth and urbanization, as well as people's attitudes and values toward wildlife. Consideration of these factors contributes to the success of the service's mission to protect wildlife and their habitats.

The refuge system works collaboratively internally and externally to leverage resources and achieve effective conservation. It works with other federal agencies, state fish and wildlife agencies, tribes, nongovernmental organizations, local landowners, community volunteers, and other partners. Meaningful engagement with stakeholders at a regional, integrated level adds to the effective conservation achievements of the FWS and allows individual refuges to respond more effectively to challenges.

Wildlife and habitat management activities include:

 Monitoring plant and animal populations
 Restoring wetland, forest, grassland, and marine habitats
 Controlling the spread of invasive species
 Reintroducing rare fish, wildlife and plants to formerly occupied habitats
 Monitoring air quality
 Investigating and cleaning contaminants
 Preventing and controlling wildlife disease outbreaks
 Assessing water quality and quantity
 Understanding the complex relationship between people and wildlife through the integration of social science
 Managing habitats through manipulation of water levels, prescribed burning, haying, grazing, timber harvest, and planting vegetation

During fiscal year 2015, the refuge system manipulated 3.1 million acres of habitat (technique #9 from the preceding list) and managed 147 million acres of the system without habitat manipulation (using techniques #1 through 8 from the preceding list).

 Uplands managed: 1.9 million acres
 Wetlands managed: 1.0 million acres
 Open water managed: 0.2 million acres
 Treated by prescribed burning: 0.3 million acres
 Treated to control invasive plants: 0.2 million acres
 Protected but not manipulated: 147 million acres

Refuges attract nearly 50 million visitors each year who come to hunt, fish, observe, and photograph wildlife, and are a significant boon to local economies. According to the FWS's 2013 Banking on Nature Report, visitors to refuges positively impact the local economies. The report details that 47 million people who visited refuges that year:

 Generated $2.4 billion of sales in regional economies
 Supported over 35,000 jobs
 Generated $342.9 million in tax revenues at the local, county, state, and federal levels
 Contributed a total of $4.5 billion to the nation's economy

The refuge system has a professional cadre of law enforcement officers that supports a broad spectrum of service programs by enforcing conservation laws established to protect the fish, wildlife, cultural, and archaeological resources the service manages in trust for the American people. They also educate the public about the FWS's mission, contribute to environmental education and outreach, provide safety and security for the visiting public, assist local communities with law enforcement and natural disaster response and recovery through emergency management programs, and help protect native subsistence rights. They are routinely involved with the greater law enforcement community in cooperative efforts to combat the nation's drug problems, address border security issues, and aid in other security challenges.

Prevention and control of wildland fires is also a part of refuge management. Completion of controlled burns to reduce fuel loading, and participation in the interagency wildland fire suppression efforts, are vital for management of refuge lands.

A considerable infrastructure of physical structures is also essential to proper management of refuge lands. As of September 30, 2015, the refuges had 13,030 roads, bridges, and trails; 5,284 buildings; 8,007 water management structures; and 7,886 other structures such as visitor facility enhancements (hunting blinds, fishing piers, boat docks, observation decks, and information kiosks). The overall facility infrastructure is valued at nearly $30 billion.

Physical features
 Area of land and water under management: 150.3 million acres
 Number of management units: 562 refuges and 38 wetland management districts
 Number of wilderness areas: 74
 Area of wilderness: 20.7 million acres
 Length of rivers within the National Wild and Scenic Rivers System: 1,086 miles (1,748 km)
 Length of refuge boundary with Mexico: 120 miles (190 km)

The area of the refuge system is heavily influenced by large areas devoted to protecting wild Alaska and to protecting marine habitats in the Pacific Ocean; however, the number of units and public visitation overwhelmingly occurs in the lower 48 states, though these refuges and wetland management districts constitute only a little over 1% of the system.

Visitation
 Wildlife observation visits in FY 2014: 29.8 million
 Nature photography visits in FY 2014: 8.4 million
 Fishing visits in FY 2014: 6.7 million
 Interpretive program visits in FY 2014: 2.8 million
 Hunting visits in FY 2014: 2.4 million
 Environmental education visits in FY 2014: 0.7 million
 Total visits in FY 2014: 47 million

Volunteers
 Total volunteers in FY 2014: 36,000
 Total volunteer hours in FY 2014: 1.4 million

Personnel
 Total staff: 3,036 full-time equivalents, thus two half-time employees count as one FTE; FY 2015 total
 Number of Federal Wildlife Officers: 256 (source: Washington office)
 Number of firefighters: 460 (360 permanent and 100 temporary staff)

Special designation areas 
In addition to refuge status, the "special" status of lands within individual refuges may be recognized by additional designations, either legislatively or administratively. Special designation may also occur through the actions of other legitimate agencies or organizations. The influence that special designations may have on the management of refuge lands and waters may vary considerably.

Special designation areas within the refuge system as of September 30, 2014, included:

 Biosphere reserves (3 units)
 Maine Protected Areas (106 units)
 National Historic Landmarks (10 units)
 National Monuments (7 units)
 National Natural Landmarks (43 units)
 National Recreation Trails (72 units)
 National Wild and Scenic Rivers (13 units)
 Ramsar wetlands of international importance (26 units)
 Research natural areas (207 units)
 Western Hemisphere Shorebird Reserve Network (19 units)
 Wilderness areas (74 units) (the system has 20.7 million acres of wilderness, 19% of U.S. wilderness)
 World Heritage sites (1 unit)

List of refuges

See also 
 Congressional Wildlife Refuge Caucus
 National Wildlife Refuge Association
 State wildlife trails
 Timeline of environmental events
 Wilderness preservation systems in the United States

References

Further reading 
 Fischman, Robert (Fall 2005). "The Significance of National Wildlife Refuges in the Development of U.S. Conservation Policy".  Journal of Land Use and Environmental Law 21:1–?. Indiana Legal Studies Research Paper No. 19. .
 Grannemann, Ken (November 2022) “History and Future of our National Wildlife Refuge System” by National Wildlife Refuge Association
 Schroeder, R. (2008). "Comprehensive conservation planning and ecological sustainability within the United States National Wildlife Refuge System". Sustainability: Science, Practice, & Policy 4(1):38–44.

External links 
 FWS.gov: official National Wildlife Refuge System−NWRS website
 FWS.gov: "Meet the National Wildlife Refuge System - Special Places Where Wildlife and People Thrive"
 FWS.gov: NWRS - Refuge Planning
 FWS.gov: NWRS establishment legislation
 National Wildlife Refuge Association — nonprofit association supporting the National Wildlife Refuge System.
 The Cooperative Alliance for Refuge Enhancement (CARE)
 
 

 

United States Fish and Wildlife Service

Protected areas of the United States
Protected areas established in 1903
1903 establishments in the United States
1903 in the environment